The Brag and Cuss is the 2007 release from Seattle singer-songwriter Rocky Votolato. It is his second album on Barsuk Records after 2006's Makers.

Track listing
 "Lilly White" – 3:41
 "Postcard from Kentucky" – 2:56
 "Before You Were Born" – 3:31
 "The Wrong Side of Reno" – 3:33
 "Red Dragon Wishes" – 3:10
 "The Blue Rose" – 2:47
 "Your Darkest Eyes" – 4:02
 "Time Is a Debt" – 2:41
 "Whiskey Straight" – 3:31
 "This Old Holland" – 4:08
 "Silver Trees" – 3:29

All lyrics and music by Rocky Votolato, except: "Before You Were Born" – Casey Foubert, Rocky Votolato, April Votolato; "Red Dragon Wishes" and "The Blue Rose" – Rocky Votolato, April Votolato; "The Old Holland" – Rocky Votolato, Michael Aaron Dooley.

External links
 Official Website
 Barsuk Records

Rocky Votolato albums
2007 albums